A surgical elevator is a tool used for scraping, elevating or dissecting bones or tissues.

See also
Instruments used in general surgery

References

https://web.archive.org/web/20100405112913/http://www.surgicalsindia.com/surgical-elevators.html

Surgical instruments